Steven Bray (born June 1969) is a British activist from Port Talbot in South Wales who, in 2018 and 2019, made daily protests against Brexit in College Green, Westminster. He is variously known as Stop Brexit Man, Mr Stop Brexit or the Stop Brexit guy. 

He was often heard during TV broadcasts from College Green at Westminster shouting anti-Brexit statements or seen quietly walking into the background of live TV interviews, wearing a colourful blue outfit and carrying placards with a simple 'Stop Brexit' or anti-government message. Since Brexit, he protests against the incumbent Conservative government more generally. 

British broadcaster ITV has referred to him as a notable figure, both for the length of his continuing protest and for the technique he used to disrupt multi-camera interviews. The Huffington Post described him as the "ultimate Brexit protester", while Labour MP Ben Bradshaw has called him an international celebrity. In late 2020 he changed his trademark EU-blue outfit for a full Soviet-era Russian general's uniform, complete with medals, as he called for the Government to investigate alleged Russian interference in the 2016 Brexit referendum.

Bray was the unsuccessful Liberal Democrat candidate for the Cynon Valley constituency in the 2019 United Kingdom general election.

Before the Brexit referendum
Steve Bray was born in June 1969 and was originally from Splott in Cardiff, South Wales. As a child he moved home frequently while his father served at RAF bases in Germany.  Before becoming involved in political activism, Bray himself served in the British Army and was a self-employed numismatist, working in Port Talbot, South Wales. Bray is divorced, with a daughter and grandson.

When Brexit became a major political issue, Bray found himself at odds with many of his friends.  In his own words, "I fell out with all my friends. They were all leavers and I binned the lot of them." His opposition to Brexit was in part due to a belief in the benefits European Union funding had provided to Port Talbot, and a sense that the leave campaigns were misrepresenting the benefits of Brexit.

Dress and style of protest

Bray has worn a European Blue jacket, and a blue top-hat with a yellow hat-band. He has a cape made up from a Union Jack sewn into an EU flag. He carried two double-sided, burgundy-coloured, A2-sized placards with the messages "Stop the BREXIT mess", "We want a people's vote", and "Things have changed, it is time to reassess".

2017 to 2019
In March 2017, Prime Minister Theresa May triggered Article 50 of the Lisbon Treaty, formally initiating Britain's withdrawal from the European Union, following the result of the 2016 advisory referendum on the UK's EU membership. Bray was incensed, leaving Port Talbot and travelling to London to protest. He later said he had never attended a demonstration prior to beginning his Brexit protest. Bray paid £8,500 to have a float carrying a larger than life size model of May's head with a pistol marked with the word "Brexit" in its mouth to be brought to the UK. Following the 2017 general election and the Conservative–DUP agreement, Bray lived on the streets in London, refusing to spend money or pay taxes, for a week in protest, during which time he began protesting outside the Houses of Parliament. During the first year of his protest, Bray and allies were present outside Parliament five days a week.

Camera teams from all news sources interview politicians on College Green, outside the Houses of Parliament. When Bray spotted a team arriving, he walked over, and as the live interview began, appeared in the background of the shot, displaying his posters. As the camera moved, so did he, remaining in the frame. He then walked off before the team could ask the police to remove him. With a two-camera interview, he knew which camera was live and moved from one to the other. In an incident on 14 November 2018, with Brexit expert Georgina Wright being interviewed by BBC News presenter Annita McVeigh, the camera-hopping lasted over two minutes.

When the camera team chose to film against the door of the Palace, Bray used another tactic. He stood close by and shouted 'Stop Brexit' over a loudhailer, interfering with the sound track. On 19 October 2019 he was clearly heard to yell during a live TV interview 'bollocks to Boris' after the Brexit deal the Prime Minister proposed was not agreed by parliament.

The BBC tried to circumvent Bray's disruption by building a  platform on which to conduct interviews. Bray was not deterred, and raised the EU flag on a 5-metre-high pole, which could be seen waving behind the presenter.

Every evening at around 6pm he performed a ritual, approaching the Palace and shouting "Stop Brexit, it's not a done deal", before leaving.  He returned at 11 the following morning and stated he would continue to do so until another referendum were called.

In January 2019, Bray moved into an apartment opposite the Westminster home of Conservative Brexiteer Jacob Rees-Mogg. To rent the property in Westminster's Cowley Street for two months, he raised more than £12,000 from the public. In response to the news of his new neighbour, Rees-Mogg said: "Should he wish to borrow a cup of sugar, he would be very welcome."

2019 general election

Steve Bray was the Liberal Democrat candidate for the Cynon Valley constituency in the 2019 United Kingdom general election. The Liberal Democrat leader, Jo Swinson, noted that Bray was a  passionate campaigner and should not be seen as a joke candidate. He came 6th of 7 candidates with 949 votes, 3.1% of the total, and lost his deposit. Madeline Grant, writing in The Daily Telegraph, argued that the Liberal Democrats' decision to run Bray, whom she did not see as a serious candidate, was part of their disastrous campaign.

Bray described the Conservative victory in the 2019 general election as "devastating".  Shortly after the result, he acknowledged that the chances of the UK remaining in the EU were "tiny" and offered that "we are all going to end up in hell after Brexit happens." Bray decided to end his daily protests after 847 days. However, he vowed to keep protesting, ditching his message of stopping Brexit in favour of an anti-Boris Johnson slogan.

2020 onwards

On 31 January 2020, the United Kingdom became the first member state to leave the EU. In response, Bray vowed to continue protesting outside Parliament, noting that he would "not give up" until the UK rejoined the EU.

On 18 January Bray was tripped up and assaulted in central London, suffering minor injuries. He described the alleged assailants as "unpleasant thugs masquerading as Brexit zealots" and noted that "they're not real Brexiteers or leavers."  No arrests were made at the time.

To highlight the report on alleged Russian interference in the Brexit referendum, in the autumn of 2020 Bray discarded his anti-Brexit top hat and cape in favour of a Soviet tank general's parade dress. Armed with a portable stereo, Bray took to blaring out the national anthem of the former USSR along Whitehall. However, by December 2020, Bray was back in usual anti-Brexit attire and attempting to heckle the Prime Minister by means of a megaphone, some distance from 10 Downing Street.

In June 2021, Bray spotted the Conservative MP Lee Anderson having a drink seated outside the Red Lion pub in Westminster.  Bray asked Anderson: "Have you got to be a Conservative MP to lie to people?" After some words were exchanged, Anderson said "You're nothing but a parasite, a malingerer and a scrounger. Now clear off."

At the Labour Party Conference in September 2021, a complaint was filed with Brighton and Hove City Council about the noise Bray was making in playing the Anthem of Europe on his speaker system outside the conference.

On 26 October 2021, Bray demonstrated, with a toilet, outside the gates of Downing Street after MPs voted down an attempt by the House of Lords to toughen up the approach to the discharge of raw sewage into rivers and coastal waters.

In May 2022, Conservative MP Marco Longhi called for Bray to be "locked up in the Tower [of London] with a loudspeaker playing "Land of Hope and Glory" on repeat at maximum volume" because of the disruption he causes. He added that staff in his Westminster office could not hear "distressed constituents on the phone" because of the loud music that Bray played.

While protesting near Parliament on 28 June 2022, Bray had his amplification equipment seized by police under the Police, Crime, Sentencing and Courts Act, which had come into force earlier that day. Bray described the police powers introduced in the Act as "fascist" and an attack on the right to protest.

On 7 July 2022, at the request of actor Hugh Grant, Bray played the tune "Yakety Sax" following the announcement by Boris Johnson that he was resigning as prime minister.

In an interview in The Guardian in July 2022, Bray said Brexit had been "the start of something far bigger" and had indicated wider flaws in the British political system.

In September 2022, Bray told foreign secretary James Cleverly that "your party is finished - the sooner you’re out of the UK the better", which Cleverly perceived as a racist "go home" comment. Bray denied the claim and posted a video of the full exchange online, saying that he had previously made the same comment to Jacob Rees-Mogg and Dominic Raab.

In late March 2023, Bray promoted on Twitter a doctored photograph of Suella Braverman set against the backdrop of Auschwitz Birkenau.

SODEM
SODEM was a political movement founded by Steve Bray in September 2017. It was an acronym for Stand of Defiance European Movement, and its colours were yellow on blue. A previous action was to secretly place the European flag on an empty flagpole outside the Neath Port Talbot council offices on 19 August 2018. Elspeth Williams, who shared a flat in London with Bray, ran SODEM's social media output.  SODEM was dissolved as a company in January 2021.

References

External links

 SODEM website

1969 births
Living people
British Army soldiers
British democracy activists
People from Port Talbot
Pro-Europeanism in the United Kingdom
Brexit
Welsh activists
British numismatists